The La Tuna Fire was a wildfire that started on September 1, 2017, and burned  through the Verdugo Mountains in Los Angeles, California. It led to the destruction of 5 homes and the evacuations of over 300 homes. It was the largest wildfire in the city of Los Angeles in 50 years.

Events
Reported in the mid-afternoon of Friday, September 1, on the 10800 block of West La Tuna Canyon Road in Sun Valley, the La Tuna Fire immediately burned north towards Interstate 210, forcing its complete closure. Fire activity was described as being erratic due to shifting winds which forced flames to jump both sides of the interstate as it began burning in four separate directions. By evening time of that Friday, the fire was an estimated 2,000 acres in size with a mere 10 percent containment.

Los Angeles Mayor Eric Garcetti declared it a local emergency and called on Governor Jerry Brown to declare a further state of emergency. On Saturday, September 2, the fire endangered homes in Burbank, Glendale and Sunland-Tujunga. It is reported as the largest fire ever inside Los Angeles city limits.

There have been four injuries. On September 2, two firefighters suffered from heat related illness. On September 3, one firefighter was treated for heat related illness and another for minor burns. A volunteer was also evacuated for medical reasons.

As of September 3, 1,061 firefighters were fighting the fire with 206 engines, 9 helicopters, 5 water tenders, and 4 dozers. Three buildings have been destroyed and one damaged. Then rain helped the wildfire from Tropical Storm Lidia (2017).

On September 9, 2017, the LA Fire Department declared that the La Tuna Fire was 100% contained.

The La Tuna Fire was the largest wildfire to break out in the city limits in the last 50 years. In response to the fire, the Los Angeles City Council began processes of creating best practices for residents to be prepared and to deal with large-scale emergencies.

On October 26, 2017, the Los Angeles Fire Department's investigation into the origins of the La Tuna Fire ended with no cause determined. The report indicated that it was "not suspicious in nature."

See also

 2017 California wildfires
 December 2017 Southern California wildfires
 2018 Southern California mudflows

References

External links

2017 California wildfires
History of Los Angeles
Verdugo Mountains
Wildfires in Los Angeles County, California